Barbara Hernandez is a Democratic member of the Illinois House of Representatives from the 50th district. The district, located in the Chicago metropolitan area, includes portions of Aurora, North Aurora, and Batavia.

In the House, Hernandez represented the 83rd District from 2019 to 2023. After new legislative maps were drawn to fit new census data, she won re-election to the House from the 50th District.

Prior to her appointment to the House, she was a member of the Kane County Board.

Illinois House of Representatives 
In 2019, Hernandez was appointed by the Democratic Representative Committee for the 83rd Representative District to fill the vacancy of the 83rd House District, which was left by Linda Chapa LaVia after her appointment to be Director of the Illinois Department of Veterans' Affairs. Hernandez was sworn into office by Judge Michael Noland on March 7, 2019. She became the youngest member of the General Assembly.

Hernandez won a first full term representing the 83rd District in 2020, defeating Republican Donald Walter.

She again defeated Walter for a third term in 2022, with both running in the redrawn 50th District.

In 2023, House Speaker Chris Welch named Hernandez an Assistant Majority Leader.

Committee assignments 
During the 102nd General Assembly, Hernandez was the Vice-Chairperson of the City and Villages Committee. She also sat on the House Committees for Energy and Environment; Appropriations - Higher Education; Housing; International Trade and Commerce; and the subcommittees for Local Government and Clean Energy.

During the 101st General Assembly, Hernandez was a member of the Cities & Villages; Counties & Townships; Energy & Environment; Higher Education; and State Government Administration committees; and the Special Investigating Committee.

Electoral history

Personal life 
Hernandez's parents emigrated from Mexico when her mother was six months pregnant with her.

She is an alumna of East Aurora High School, Waubonsee Community College, and Aurora University, having received both a B.S and a master’s degree from Aurora University.

Around March 1, 2022, Hernandez experienced a stroke on the House floor. She returned to Springfield on November 15, 2022.

Hernandez resides in Aurora.

References

External links
 Profile at the Illinois General Assembly's official website

1990s births
21st-century American politicians
21st-century American women politicians
Aurora University alumni
People from Aurora, Illinois
Women state legislators in Illinois
Democratic Party members of the Illinois House of Representatives
Hispanic and Latino American state legislators in Illinois
Living people